Međeđa may refer to the following places in Bosnia and Herzegovina:

 Međeđa (Kozarska Dubica)
 Međeđa, Sapna
 Međeđa (Višegrad)